Cason was a Panamanian cargo ship.

Cason may also refer to:

Cason (surname)
Cason, Texas, an unincorporated community in the United States

See also
Caisson (disambiguation)